Sir William Japp Sinclair was professor of obstetrics and gynaecology at the Victoria University of Manchester. He was knighted at Buckingham Palace in 1904.

References 

Year of birth missing
Year of death missing
Academics of the University of Manchester
British obstetricians
British gynaecologists
Knights Bachelor